The Archdeacon of Margam is a senior cleric of the Diocese of Llandaff. The archdeacon is responsible for the disciplinary supervision of the clergy in the deaneries of Neath, Margam, Bridgend, the Cynon Valley, the Rhondda and the Vale of Glamorgan.

The post was created in 1948.

Archdeacons of Margam
1948-1960 Lawrence Thomas
1961-1965 Thomas Hughes, Assistant Bishop (afterwards Archdeacon of Llandaff, 1965)
?1965-1971 Eric Roberts (afterwards Bishop of St Davids, 1971)
1971-1981 David Reece (Assistant Bishop from 1977)
1981-1988 Albert Lewis (afterwards Archdeacon of Llandaff, 1988)
1988-1992 Gordon James 
1992-2001 Martin Williams (afterwards Archdeacon of Morgannwg, 2002)
2001-2015 Philip Morris
2015 - 2018: vacant
27 September 2018present: Michael Komor

References